Gəraybəyli (also, Qarabəyli and Geraybeyli) is a village and municipality in the Ujar Rayon of Azerbaijan.  It has a population of 1,128.

References 

Populated places in Ujar District